Adolf Rössler (1814, Usingen – 1885, Wiesbaden), was a  German entomologist who specialised in Lepidoptera.Amongst others he described Cochylidia moguntiana (Rössler, 1864), Aethes bilbaensis (Rössler, 1877) and Eupithecia millefoliata Rössler, 1866

Adolf Rössler, also Adolph, was a jurist and artist. His collection of Palearctic Lepidoptera is held by Museum Wiesbaden.

References
Nachruf
Pagenstecher, A. 1886: [Roessler, A.] Entomologische Zeitung, Stettin pp. 19–22
 Gaedike, R.; Groll, E. K. & Taeger, A. 2012: Bibliography of the entomological literature from the beginning until 1863 : online database – version 1.0 – Senckenberg Deutsches Entomologisches Institut.
Groll, E. K. 2017: Biographies of the Entomologists of the World. – Online database, version 8, Senckenberg Deutsches Entomologisches Institut, Müncheberg – URL: sdei.senckenberg.de/biografies

1885 deaths
1814 births
German lepidopterists